Lookout is an unincorporated community in Fayette County, West Virginia, United States. Lookout has a post office with ZIP code 25868.

The community was so named due to the fact Indians used the elevated town site to look out over the surrounding area.

References

Unincorporated communities in Fayette County, West Virginia
Unincorporated communities in West Virginia